Michele Pio Pirro (born 5 July 1986) is a motorcycle road racer from Italy, He was 2007 and 2008 the Italian CIV National Champion in the Superstock class and a test rider for Ducati factory racing in MotoGP and rides occasionally as a wildcard.

He has also competed in Grand Prix motorcycle racing and the Supersport World Championship.

Career

125cc World Championship (2003–2006)
He began his Grand Prix career as a wild card in the 2003 Italian Grand Prix in the 125cc class, on an Aprilia motorcycle. After winning the European 125cc Championship in 2004, in 2005 he participated as a full-time rider in the same class with Malaguti, scoring 3 points in the Chinese Grand Prix and finishing the season in 33rd place. In 2006, he continued to race in the 125 class on an Aprilia – and later a Honda – without scoring points.

National racing (2007–2008)
In 2007 and 2008 he won the Italian National Championship (CIV) in the Superstock class on a Yamaha YZF-R1.

Supersport World Championship (2009–2010)
In 2009 he participated in the Supersport World Championship on a Yamaha, ending in 11th place. In the same year he won the Italian Supersport Championship. The following year he switched to Honda and finished in 5th place, with a victory in the Italian round at Imola. He also made a one-off appearance in the Moto2 World Championship at the Aragon Grand Prix, finishing 14th.

Moto2 & MotoGP World Championship (2011–2012)
Pirro returned to Grand Prix racing in 2011 in Moto2 with Team Gresini. He obtained a victory, in the season finale at Valencia, just two weeks after Gresini's MotoGP rider Marco Simoncelli was killed in a crash at the Malaysian Grand Prix.

His MotoGP career began in 2012 with Gresini on a FTR motorcycle, with a best placement of fifth at the Valencian Grand Prix, ending the season in 15th place with 43 points.

Ducati Test Rider (2013–present)
Since 2013, Pirro has been the official test rider of team Ducati. He has participated in races every year, either as a wildcard entry or as a substitute for injured riders, obtaining his overall best MotoGP result of 4th at the 2018 Valencian season finale.

During the 2013 season he participated in ten total races (3 as a wildcard and 7 as a substitute for the injured Ben Spies), with a best result of seventh at the Italian Grand Prix, ending the season in thirteenth place with 56 points. In 2014, Pirro replaced the injured Cal Crutchlow in the Argentine Grand Prix and participated as a wild-card in five races.

In 2015 and 2016 he continued to be the official Ducati test rider, while also participating in the Italian Superbike Championship (CIV), which he won in 2015. In 2015, he participated as a wild card in the Italian and San Marino MotoGP rounds. He also raced in the Italian round of the Superbike World Championship in Misano as a wild card, and in the Spanish GP as a substitute for the injured Davide Giugliano. In 2016, he substituted the injured Danilo Petrucci for the Pramac Ducati team in Argentina, Texas and Jerez MotoGP races, he participated as a wild card for the Ducati factory team at the Italian GP at Mugello, he replaced the injured Loris Baz at the Catalan GP and the Dutch TT on an Avintia Ducati and he appeared again with the factory team at the Austrian GP as a wild-card entry and at San Marino and Aragon as replacement for the injured Andrea Iannone.

He continued to participate in MotoGP as Ducati's wild card rider in 2017 and 2018. During a practice session for the 2018 Italian Grand Prix he suffered a severe crash at the end of the start/finish straight and was hospitalised with a concussion. He made a further three wildcard entries in Italy, San Marino, and Valencia in 2019. In 2017, 2018 and 2019 he won again the CIV Superbike Championship. In 2020, Pirro substituted the recovering Francesco Bagnaia at Pramac for the Austrian round.

Career statistics

Grand Prix motorcycle racing

By season

By class

Races by year
(key) (Races in bold indicate pole position, races in italics indicate fastest lap)

Supersport World Championship

Races by year
(key) (Races in bold indicate pole position; races in italics indicate fastest lap)

Superbike World Championship

Races by year
(key) (Races in bold indicate pole position; races in italics indicate fastest lap)

References

External links

 

1986 births
Living people
People from San Giovanni Rotondo
125cc World Championship riders
Moto2 World Championship riders
Italian motorcycle racers
Supersport World Championship riders
Ducati Corse MotoGP riders
FIM Superstock 1000 Cup riders
Superbike World Championship riders
Avintia Racing MotoGP riders
Pramac Racing MotoGP riders
Gresini Racing MotoGP riders
MotoGP World Championship riders
Motorcycle racers of Fiamme Oro
Sportspeople from the Province of Foggia